Joseph Nalbandian (1919 – after 1985) was a Lebanese football player and manager.

During the 1930s and 1940s, Nalbandian played as a goalkeeper for DPHB, Hilmi-Sport, Sagesse, Homenetmen, and Nahda, at club level. He also represented Lebanon internationally.

Nalbandian coached Homenetmen, from 1947 to 1972, and Lebanon, during the 1950s and 1960s. He was in the Regional Committee of Homenetmen between 1965 and 1971, and was General Secretary of the Lebanese Football Association between 1967 and 1985.

Honours

Manager 
Homenetmen Beirut
 Lebanese Premier League: 1947–48, 1950–51, 1954–55, 1962–63, 1968–69
 Lebanese FA Cup: 1947–48, 1961–62

Lebanon
 Mediterranean Games third place: 1959
 Arab Nations Cup third place: 1963

References

External links

 

1919 births
Year of death missing
Lebanese people of Armenian descent
Ethnic Armenian sportspeople
Lebanese footballers
Association football goalkeepers
Lebanese Premier League players
AS DPHB players
Homenetmen Beirut footballers
Al Nahda SC players
AS Hilmi-Sport players
Sagesse SC footballers
Lebanon international footballers
Lebanese football managers
Lebanon national football team managers
Lebanese Premier League managers
Homenetmen Beirut (football) managers